The United States Customs House and Court House, also known as Old Galveston Customhouse, in Galveston, Texas, is a former home of custom house, post office, and court facilities for the United States District Court for the Eastern District of Texas, and later for the United States District Court for the Southern District of Texas. Completed in 1861, the structure is now leased by the General Services Administration to the Galveston Historical Foundation.  The courthouse function was replaced in 1937 by the Galveston United States Post Office and Courthouse.

Building history
The building symbolized the importance and prosperity of Galveston which was Texas' leading seaport and commercial city during the nineteenth century, and the port where most of the imported commercial goods entered the state. The city's business community was primarily concerned with wholesale commerce, and furnished the trade goods for all of Texas, the Indian Territory, and parts of Louisiana and New Mexico. With rising revenue from customs receipts, the United States Congress approved funds in 1855 for a new U.S. custom house.

Supervising Architect of the Treasury Ammi Burnham Young produced the original design for the building in 1857. Public officials immediately rejected Young's three-story design on the grounds that it lacked sufficient space. A new scheme by Charles B. Cluskey (1805–1871) and E.W. Moore (1810–1865) was accepted in 1859. Their design was based on Young's concept, but provided additional space for the Custom Service and Post Office.

The building was begun in 1860 and completed in 1861. The Boston firm of Blaisdell and Emerson built it in 114 days, an unprecedented accomplishment at the time. The extensive use of fireproof cast iron was revolutionary then and likely accounted for the building's survival from the 1885 Galveston fire. During the Civil War, the Confederate Army occupied the building. In 1865 it was the site of the ceremony officially ending the war in Galveston. The U.S. Government resumed occupancy that year after making extensive repairs. It served as a courthouse for the United States District Court for the Eastern District of Texas from 1862 until 1891, and was then retired from court service for a time.

Significant alterations were made in 1917, when the General Services Administration added courtrooms and judicial offices to the second floor of the U.S. Custom House, which then became the Federal Courthouse, serving the United States District Court for the Southern District of Texas. This location would later become the seat of the Galveston Division, after congress added a second judgeship in the 1930s. The building continued to serve as a courthouse until 1917, and housed offices for federal agencies throughout the twentieth century. It was listed in the National Register of Historic Places in 1970. In 1998 the Galveston Historical Foundation signed a cooperative agreement with the U.S. General Services Administration that permitted the Foundation to lease and rehabilitate the building for its headquarters.

Architecture
The U.S. Custom House in Galveston is a simply detailed Classical Revival, two-story, brick building located near the waterfront in Galveston. The most notable features are the projecting double gallery on the west facade and the inset double galleries on the longer, north and south facades. The exterior walls are hard-fired, red-brown bricks with tan bricks used as accents around the corners and doorjambs. The prominent location at the southeast corner of Twentieth and Post Office (Avenue E) Streets emphasizes its importance to Galveston's shipping-based economy.

Nearly all the original decorative elements on the exterior of the building are cast iron including columns, cornices, balustrades, dentils, entablatures, and window architraves. These elements from the specifications and designs of the original architect Ammi B. Young, were made in New York City and shipped to Galveston. The first-story galleries have Ionic columns set on a granite base. An entablature extends completely around the building separating the first and second floors. The piano nobile is larger in height, and the galleries contain taller, Corinthian columns and a cast-iron balustrade. A classically inspired balustrade caps the building.

The interior of the building is H-shaped in plan and was originally designed to provide space for the Customs Service and the Post Office. Extant original elements include the elaborate cast-iron, double-return stair leading to the second floor. The stair's ornamental newel posts have an acanthus motif and fluted shafts set on octagonal bases. The cast-iron risers are pierced with a circular fret design.

In 1917 the U.S. Custom House was converted for use as a Federal courthouse and a courtroom was created on the second floor. The U.S. Custom House survived the Civil War and various disasters including the 1885 Galveston Fire, the Great Galveston Hurricane of 1900, Hurricane Carla in 1967, and a boiler explosion in 1978 that resulted in the closing of the second floor for almost two decades. Although these events required extensive repairs and renovations, the U.S. Custom House's fireproof construction ensured the survival of its most significant stylistic elements.

In 1998 a public-private partnership was established between the U.S. General Services Administration and the Galveston Historical Foundation to allow for the restoration of the building by the Galveston Historical Foundation for use as its headquarters and historic preservation resource center. Assisted by private donations, the careful and sensitive rehabilitation included the removal of 1960s dropped ceilings, the restoration of the second floor, and the removal of the non-original interior wood shutters. The Galveston Historical Foundation formally moved into the refurbished U.S. Custom House in June 1999.

Significant events

1857-1859: Supervising Architect of the Treasury Ammi B. Young produces the original design for the U.S. Custom House.
1860-1861: U.S Custom House is constructed based on the redesign by local superintendents Charles B. Cluskey and E.W. Moore.
1865: Occupied by the Confederate Army, the building is the site of the ceremony ending the Civil War in Galveston. The U.S. Customs Service resumes occupancy.
1900: The U.S. Custom House is damaged by the Galveston Hurricane.
1917-1918: A courtroom is created on the second floor for use by the Federal Courts.
1967: Following the repair of extensive damages caused by Hurricane Carla, the building is formally rededicated on June 17.
1970: The U.S. Custom House is listed in the National Register of Historic Places.
1978: A boiler explosion damages the building and the second floor is closed.
1998-1999: A public-private partnership results in the restoration and use of the building by the Galveston Historical Foundation.

Building facts
Architects: Original design by Ammi B. Young, Supervising Architect of the Treasury
Revised, executed design by Charles B. Cluskey and E.W. Moore
Construction Dates: 1860-1861
Landmark Status: Listed in the National Register of Historic Places
Location: 502 Twentieth Street
Architectural Style: Classical Revival
Primary Materials: Brick and cast iron
Prominent Features: Two-story galleries

See also

National Register of Historic Places listings in Galveston County, Texas

References

External links

Attribution

Government buildings completed in 1861
Former federal courthouses in the United States
Buildings and structures in Galveston, Texas
History of Galveston, Texas
National Register of Historic Places in Galveston County, Texas
Custom houses in the United States
Ammi B. Young buildings
1861 establishments in Texas
Government buildings on the National Register of Historic Places in Texas
Custom houses on the National Register of Historic Places